In tropical analysis, tropical cryptography refers to the study of a class of cryptographic protocols built upon tropical algebras. In many cases, tropical cryptographic schemes have arisen from adapting classical (non-tropical) schemes to instead rely on tropical algebras. The case for the use of tropical algebras in cryptography rests on at least two key features of tropical mathematics: in the tropical world, there is no classical multiplication (a computationally expensive operation), and the problem of solving systems of tropical polynomial equations has been shown to be NP-hard.

Basic Definitions
The key mathematical object at the heart of tropical cryptography is the tropical semiring  (also known as the min-plus algebra), or a generalization thereof. The operations are defined as follows for : 
 
 

References 

Cryptography
Tropical geometry